The 1060s BC is a decade which lasted from 1069 BC to 1060 BC.

Events and trends
 c. 1069 BC – End of New Kingdom in Ancient Egypt.
 c. 1069 BC – Third Intermediate Period of Egypt starts.
 1069 BC – Ramses XI dies, ending the Twentieth Dynasty. He is succeeded by Smendes I, who founds the Twenty-first Dynasty.
 1068 BC – Codrus, legendary King of Athens, dies in battle against Dorian invaders after a reign of 21 years. Athenian tradition considers him the last King to have held absolute power. Modern historians consider him the last King whose life account is part of Greek mythology. He is succeeded by his son Medon.